In grammar, the elative case (abbreviated ; from  "to bring or carry out") is a locative grammatical case signifying that something comes from something, somewhere or someone.

Usage

Uralic languages
In Hungarian, the suffix  expresses the elative:

 - "out of the house, from the house" (Finnish  = "house")  -  "out of the houses, from the houses" (Finnish  = "houses")
 - "out of the house, from the house" (Estonian  = "house")
Erzya:  - "out of the house, from the house" (Erzya  = "house")
 - "out of the house" (Hungarian  = "house")

In some dialects of Finnish it is common to drop the final vowel of the elative ending, which then becomes identical to the elative morpheme of Estonian; for example: . This pronunciation is common in southern Finland, appearing in the southwestern dialects and in some Tavastian dialects. Most other dialects use the standard form -sta.

Russian
In some rare cases the elative still exists in contemporary Russian, though it was used more widely in 17-18th cc. texts:  (out of the forest),  (blood from the nose),  (from Yaroslavl).

See also

Other locative cases are:
Inessive case ("in")
Illative case ("into")
Adessive case ("on")
Allative case ("onto")
Ablative case ("off")
Delative case ("off of a surface")

References

Further reading
 
 

Grammatical cases